Ngai is the transliteration of three Chinese surnames in Hong Kong based on Cantonese:

魏, also common in northern China as Wei (pinyin: Wèi)
危, pinyin: Wēi
倪, pinyin: Ní

All three characters are written the same way in both traditional and simplified writing systems.

See also
 Wei (surname)
 Ni (surname)

Chinese-language surnames
Multiple Chinese surnames
Cantonese-language surnames